Alvin Robert Lamar Jones III (born September 9, 1978) is a Luxembourgian-American professional basketball player. A 6'11" (2.11 m), 265 lb (120 kg) center, he attended Kathleen High School in Lakeland, Florida, and played collegiately at the Georgia Institute of Technology, where he set the all-time record for shots blocked with 425.

Jones was drafted by the Philadelphia 76ers with the 56th pick of the 2001 NBA Draft. He played one NBA season (2001–02), averaging 1.1 points and 1.6 rebounds in 23 games. His final NBA game was Game 5 of the 2002 Eastern Conference First Round against the Boston Celtics where the 76ers lost the game 87 - 120. Jones recorded 1 rebound and 1 turnover in 4 minutes of playing time and the 76ers were eliminated from the playoffs 4-1.

In 2006, he played with German team RheinEnergie.

See also
List of NCAA Division I men's basketball career blocks leaders

References

External links
 NBA.com: Alvin Jones Player Info
 Alvin Jones NBA statistics, basketball-reference.com

1978 births
Living people
American expatriate basketball people in Bulgaria
American expatriate basketball people in Germany
American expatriate basketball people in Poland
American expatriate basketball people in Spain
American expatriate basketball people in Turkey
American men's basketball players
BC CSKA Sofia players
Centers (basketball)
Georgia Tech Yellow Jackets men's basketball players
Köln 99ers players
Liga ACB players
Luxembourgian men's basketball players
Philadelphia 76ers draft picks
Philadelphia 76ers players
Real Betis Baloncesto players
Śląsk Wrocław basketball players
Valencia Basket players